Black ops are a kind of covert operation. 

Black Ops may also refer to:
Black Ops (developer), a video game developer
Black Ops (film), a 2019 horror film
Black Ops alternative title for Deadwater (film), 2008 horror film
Call of Duty: Black Ops, a 2010 video game by Treyarch
Call of Duty: Black Ops II, a 2012 video game
Call of Duty: Black Ops III, a 2015 video game
Call of Duty: Black Ops 4, a 2018 video game
Call of Duty: Black Ops Cold War, a 2020 video game
Call of Duty: Black Ops: Declassified, a video game by NStigate Games for the PS Vita
GURPS Black Ops, a role-playing game sourcebook
"Black Ops", a song by They Might Be Giants from Nanobots
"Black Ops", a song by Chief Keef from Finally Rollin 2

See also